Gandalfia is a monotypic genus of flatworms belonging to the family Trigonostomidae. The only species is Gandalfia bilunata.

The species is found in Indian Ocean.

References

Rhabdocoela
Rhabditophora genera
Monotypic platyhelminthes genera
Organisms named after Tolkien and his works